Bokermannohyla diamantina is a species of frogs in the family Hylidae. It is endemic to Brazil.

References

Bokermannohyla
Endemic fauna of Brazil
Frogs of South America
Amphibians described in 2006